Joaquín Marcó Figueroa (4 February 1892 - 18 October 1956) was a Chilean author, civil engineer and public servant. He was superintendent of the Casa de Moneda de Chile mint from 1930 to his death in 1956. In 1946, he published a book titled "Chile Marca un Camino", with the intention to highlight the political and social evolution of Chile.

Biography 
Joaquín Marcó was born in 1892 to a Spanish father who worked as a merchant, Joaquín Marcó Anaut and an Argentinian woman named Lorina Elvira Figueroa.  He studied his elementary and high school years in the School of German Fathers and the "José A. Carvajal" public school, both in the capital of Atacama. For his undergraduate studies, he went to the distinguished Universidad de Chile, where he graduated as a Civil Engineer in 1917. The title of his thesis was "Irrigación de la Rinconada de Chena". He participated in the execution of the electrification project between Santiago and Valparaíso.

Casa de Moneda de Chile 
In 1930, he was appointed superintendent of the Casa de Moneda de Chile, the only person from Atacama to have held that position. 
He advocated to change the diameter of the coins circulating in Chile at the time. The reason was a proposal for the one peso coin and five pesos coin to be the same diameter. His justification came as:

Chile Marca un Camino 
Published in 1942, for a limited run in Buenos Aires, his first and only book was well-received and is still available in different public libraries, particularly the National Library of Chile.

Death 
After returning from his studies in Santiago to his native town of Copiapó, he was affected by Staphylococcus Aureus. He died in 1956 in his home of the Cristóbal Colón avenue, after the bacteria impacted the valves in his heart due to the lack of Digitoxin in the country.

References

1892 births
1956 deaths
University of Chile alumni
Chilean civil servants
20th-century Chilean people
20th-century Chilean engineers